Molini di Triora is a comune (municipality) in the Province of Imperia in the Italian region Liguria, located about  southwest of Genoa and about  northwest of Imperia.

Molini di Triora borders the following municipalities: Badalucco, Bajardo, Carpasio, Castelvittorio, Montalto Ligure, Montegrosso Pian Latte, Rezzo, and Triora.

The photo over shows the village  called Corte, not Molini di Triora. Corte is close to Molini di Triora, but higher up.

Demographic evolution

Climate
The Köppen Climate Classification subtype for this climate is "Csb". (Mediterranean Climate).

Persons linked to Molini 
 Michael Green (painter and sculptor)

References

External links
 

Cities and towns in Liguria